Paul Denino (born September 29, 1994), better known as Ice Poseidon, is an American Internet personality, and live streamer, primarily of the video game Old School RuneScape and the  genre. His peak prominence was in 2017 when his IRL streams became popular. He is best known for his IRL streams, which he describes as "life streaming". Rolling Stone named Denino as a "pioneer 'life streamer'."

Initially a streamer on Twitch, Denino was publicly banned from the platform for being swatted off an airplane at Phoenix airport after a viewer called in a bomb threat under Denino's name. Following several years of streaming on YouTube, Denino moved to Mixer, only for the streaming platform to shut down in July 2020. Denino has returned to streaming on YouTube and continues streaming regularly as of June 2021.

Streaming career

Twitch 
Denino was a partnered streamer on Twitch. He rose to prominence for his Old School RuneScape streams in 2015 playing under the pseudonym "Ice Poseidon", which he created using a random name generator when he was twelve years old. He moved into streaming IRL, beginning by streaming himself playing Pokémon Go. He was banned multiple times on Twitch. In late December 2016, Twitch announced the launch of the IRL section, allowing Denino to stream without the involvement of gaming for the first time. Denino was banned during the section's launch day because he revealed a phone number on stream. This was his third ban on the platform, this time resulting in a 45-day ban. During the ban, Denino decided to move to California to pursue his Twitch career full-time. He frequently traveled around the country IRL streaming, averaging ten to thirty thousand concurrent viewers.

Suspension from Twitch 
He was banned from Twitch on April 28, 2017, after being swatted on American Airlines Flight 458 in Phoenix, where police officers removed Denino and another person. The incident made national news across the US as a hoax bomb threat had been called in by one of Denino's viewers under his name. While this was not the first time he had been swatted during a livestream it was the first on Twitch to lead to a permanent suspension.

The decision to ban Ice Poseidon from Twitch sparked controversy with some believing his ban was unjustified, including Denino himself. Some members of the community demanded that Twitch undo the ban citing complaints that the Twitch terms of service were too vague and with Denino stating "when you look at the [terms of service], there was no rules saying that you shouldn't leak your location".

YouTube 
Following his ban from Twitch in spring 2017, Denino took to YouTube, taking most of his fans (the "Purple Army") with him, a rarity for streamers.

Denino's fanbase is controversial, with some describing the community as 'toxic' due to their frequent use of racial and sexual slurs, and harassment. His community is largely based around his sizeable Discord community and his Reddit subreddit /r/Ice_Poseidon which was initially placed under "quarantine" by Reddit, and subsequently banned in October 2019 along with its community-run sister Subreddit /r/Ice_Poseidon2. Denino admits that it is nearly impossible to hide anything from the "Purple Army".

Denino quickly became one of the most popular livestreamers in the world focusing primarily on the IRL genre using a mobile broadcasting rig of his own design. His streams are known for their 'edgy' humor and interaction with viewers through text-to-speech and viewers meeting him in public by determining his location, a process known as 'stream sniping'. Denino's openness about his life has led to multiple incidents in public due to viewers calling and harassing nearby store owners by making baseless threats and warning that Denino is a risk in order to provoke violence or have police called on Denino.

During Denino's trip to Europe, he visited Zurich, Switzerland, and was featured in a tabloid magazine that discussed him being evicted out of multiple hotels for harassment and disobeying filming laws of the country.

His continual swatting provoked a debate within the streamer community on whether such content should no longer be publicized due to the media contagion effect which may encourage more people to swat him and as a result many Twitch/streamer communities banned the posting of swatting clips.

On the morning of March 21, 2019, Denino's residence in Los Angeles, was raided by the FBI and his Cx Network subsequently folded in March 2019.

Mixer 
On August 1, 2019, Denino started streaming on Microsoft's streaming-platform, Mixer. He stated that he was trying out Mixer in comparison to YouTube and that Mixer's community and active staff-support made the community much more welcoming than YouTube. Another reason given for the platform switch was "YouTube has only downgraded their streaming discoverability over the years which sucks for the streamers." On the week of January 20, 2020 to January 24, 2020, Denino hosted Mixer's first 5-day long game show called "Scuffed Brother" featuring other Mixer streamers and partners. The reality event modeled CBS' Big Brother where contestants are locked in a house and compete for money. The event was a success, with the 5 days racking up 500,000,000 sparks from viewer voting and 350,000 views.
As of June 12, 2020, Ice Poseidon had 39,995 followers and 2,225,145 total views. On June 22, 2020, Mixer announced it was shutting down and partnering with Facebook Gaming.

Esports

NRG 
From September 2016 Denino was affiliated with the eSports organization NRG Esports as part of their Old School RuneScape roster and as a content creator. The sponsorship provided management services through team NRG's Brent Kaskel. In June 2019, Denino announced he was no longer working with Kaskel after allegations of sexual abuse were made against Kaskel. Denino earned about US$60,000 dollars per month through various sponsorships.

CxCoin and scamming
Denino launched in July 2021 a cryptocurrency he called "CxCoin" with the aim of allowing streamers to "receive support" despite previously admitting in an earlier YouTube stream that he would use cryptocurrency to scam unsuspecting buyers out of their money. In January 2022, Paul admitted to scamming over $500k from his fans in a pump and dump crypto scheme by removing funds from the liquidity pool as well as withdrawing from the pre-sale and marketing wallet. He later denied the project was a scam arguing he did not advertise the project to casual fans and defended his withdrawals from the liquidity pool. The CxCoin website permanently went offline between June 18 and August 30 2022.

Other ventures 
On November 19, 2022, Denino made his professional boxing debut agaisnt Brandon Buckingham at the Moody Center, in Austin, Texas. Buckingham defeated Denino via first round knockout.

Denino took part in the first ever tag team boxing match on March 4, 2023 in the Telford International Centre in Telford, England. Denino's partner is Anthony Vargas and their team name name is 'D-Generation Ice'. Their opponents are Luis Alcaraz Pineda and BDave named as 'Los Pineda Coladas'. They lost after Pineda and BDave both hit a flurry of shots onto Denino, before the ref called the bout, leading both Denino and Vargas to lose via TKO.

Professional boxing record

Awards and nominations

References

External links 
 IcePoseidon YouTube Channel
 Ice Poseidon Instagram

1994 births
American fraudsters
American people of Italian descent
American YouTubers
Twitch (service) streamers
Living people
YouTube streamers
People from Florida
People from California
YouTube boxers